The Order Sons and Daughters of Italy in America, formerly the Order Sons of Italy in America (OSIA) is the largest and the oldest Italian American fraternal organization in the United States. A similar organization exists in Canada.

It has more than 600,000 members and supporters. Since its founding in 1905 it has established more than 2,800 lodges in 43 states, with the headquarters located near Capitol Hill in Washington, D.C.

History
It was founded on June 22, 1905, by Vincenzo Sellaro to help assimilate Italians into American society during the immigration boom of the early 20th century. In 1928 Sellaro was given the key to the City of New York in recognition of his social and medical achievements.

After World War II, the organization faced criticism for the "heavy involvement by the OSIA in Mussolini's Fascist propaganda campaign in the 1920s and 1930s".

During its history, OSIA has been involved in promoting immigration legislation, assisting in the assimilation process, supporting cooperation, trade, and diplomatic relations between the United States and Italy, initiating social and fraternal events, encouraging educational achievement through scholarships, serving local communities through a variety of cultural events and raising funds for local charities, and providing low-cost group financial investments and insurance.

Mission
As an Italian American organization, its current missions include encouraging the study of the Italian language and culture in American schools and universities, preserving Italian American traditions, culture, history and heritage, and promoting closer cultural relations between the United States and Italy.

The Order Sons of Italy contains two subsidiaries:
The Sons of Italy Foundation (SIF), is a private, philanthropic institution established by OSIA in 1959. The SIF has given nearly US$163 million to scholarships, medical research, cultural preservation, disaster relief, and other causes.
The Commission for Social Justice (CSJ), founded in 1979 to protest the stereotyping of Italian Americans by entertainment, advertising and news industries. In 2009, the CSJ successfully worked to remove from the air what CSJ deemed offensive and derogatory national advertising campaigns by major US companies.

OSIA has more than 600,000 members and supporters and a network of more than 650 chapters coast to coast, making it a leading service and advocacy organization for the United States' estimated 26 million people of Italian descent.

Historical timeline
The following information is from the national OSIA website:
1905 – June 22 – OSIA founded as “Figli d’Italia” at 203 Grand Street in New York City at the office and residence of Dr. Vincenzo Sellaro. (Later renamed “L’Ordine Figli d’Italia in America.”) A week later, Dr. Sellaro is elected first “Supreme Venerable” or president.
1906 – OSIA has eight lodges in New York and one in New Jersey.
1911 – Grand Lodge of New York becomes first state chapter; puts a representative on Ellis Island to help new Italian immigrants.
1913 – OSIA encourages members to join unions and support labor protests such as the Paterson textile workers strike in New Jersey.
1914 – OSIA holds first convention in Paterson, New Jersey Beginning in 1917 in Cleveland, OSIA begins holding conventions every two years.
1915 – OSIA publishes the weekly Bollettino Ufficiale. In 1946 the Bollettino is replaced with OSIA News, a monthly newspaper. In 1996, the newspaper is replaced with Italian America, a full-color quarterly magazine free to all members.
1917 – President Woodrow Wilson receives OSIA leaders at the White House. Since then, every U.S. president has publicly acknowledged the contributions of OSIA, including Herbert Hoover, Franklin D. Roosevelt, Harry S. Truman, Lyndon B. Johnson, Richard M. Nixon, Jimmy Carter, Ronald Reagan, George H.W. Bush, Bill Clinton and George W. Bush.
1918 – An estimated 28,000 OSIA members serve in the U.S. armed forces during World War I. Of these 1,278 are wounded and 975 killed. OSIA gives subsidies to servicemen's families.
OSIA lodges contribute $2 million and 3.5 million lire for war victims, Liberty Loans (war bonds), the Red Cross and post-war loans to Italian government.
OSIA establishes free English language and citizenship classes for members.
1919 – OSIA takes over administration of Antonio Meucci’s home on Staten Island, N.Y. In 1956, OSIA turns Meucci home into the Garibaldi–Meucci Museum, a center for Italian culture and language learning. Today it is one of only two 2 ethnic museums in the U.S. with landmark status.
1922 – The government of Italy designates OSIA its official representative of Italians in the United States. OSIA sponsors student exchanges and annual pilgrimages to Italy where OSIA leaders meet with the Pope, the king of Italy and government leaders.
1924 – The eight largest Grand Lodges enroll more than 80,000 members in their sickness and death insurance programs.
1927 – OSIA protests the execution of Sacco and Vanzetti.
1930 – OSIA membership peaks at 350,000 in more than 1,000 lodges coast to coast.
1931 – Louise Porreca becomes first woman to serve on Supreme Council when she is elected a Supreme trustee.
1932 – OSIA founder, Dr. Vincenzo Sellaro dies on November 28 of diabetes and heart disease at age 64.
OSIA enrolls 1,500 young Italian Americans in 12 youth lodges during a mass meeting in New York City. Eventually 366 youth lodges were created, 132 of them in Massachusetts.
1942 – OSIA hires Leonard Pasqualicchio as its first national deputy to lobby in Washington, D.C. He served until 1957. Among his achievements, he convinces government to drop wartime “enemy alien” designation of non-naturalized Italians living in America and presses successfully for federal government to include Italy in the Marshall Plan to rebuild post-war Italy.
1947 – OSIA launches letter-writing campaign urging members’ relatives in Italy not to vote Communist in the first democratic election in Italy's history.
1954 – OSIA steps up campaign to make Columbus Day a federal holiday. In 1932 the Order began lobbying Congress and the White House for this holiday.
1959 – OSIA establishes Sons of Italy Foundation, its philanthropic arm.
1963 – OSIA initiates letter-writing campaign to make Columbus Day a holiday.
1965 – Grace Grenco is elected president of the Grand Lodge of Florida, becoming the first woman to hold the office of OSIA grand lodge president.
OSIA supports passage of the 1965 Immigration Act which abolishes the 1924 McCarran–Walter Act that discriminated against Southern Europeans by establishing unfairly low quotas.
1968 – President Lyndon B. Johnson signs law designating the second Monday in October as “Columbus Day” and a federal holiday.
1971 – President Richard M. Nixon receives the OSIA Marconi Award during a ceremony at the White House.
1973 – OSIA helps create the Italian American Congressional Caucus, uniting for the first time all the Italian Americans serving in the U.S. House of Representatives and the U.S. Senate.
OSIA also helps found the National Italian American Coordinating Association, a federation of national Italian American organizations now known as the Conference of Presidents of Major Italian American Organizations.
1979 – President Jimmy Carter addresses OSIA’S 36th Biennial Convention in Baltimore.
1980 – OSIA celebrates its 75th anniversary. U.S. Congress proclaims June 22 “National Italian American Day”
President Jimmy Carter awards OSIA member and WW II veteran Anthony Casamento the Medal of Honor, following OSIA's three-year campaign.
1981 – OSIA purchases a building for its national headquarters and hires a full-time national executive director in Washington, D.C. From 1905 to 1955, the headquarters was in New York City and, later, Philadelphia.
1982 – OSIA establishes the Commission for Social Justice (CSJ), its anti-defamation arm.
1984 – SIF approves $100,000 project to record and preserve OSIA archives at the Immigration History Research Center Archives, University of Minnesota Libraries.
1985 – OSIA elects first women to Supreme Council: Josephine Falco, National Recording Secretary; Margaret Montemuro, National Financial Secretary; Joanne L. Strollo, Fourth National Vice President and Giulia Besozzi, Supreme Trustee.
Establishes the Douhet–Mitchell International Airpower Trophies, given annually to two outstanding Italian and American staff officers.
1989 – SIF holds first National Education & Leadership Awards (NELA) Gala in Washington, D.C. to honor outstanding Italian American students and leaders.
OSIA archives at the Immigration History Research Center Archives, University of Minnesota Libraries, are opened. Its 1,200-plus linear feet make it the largest collection of Italian American resource materials in the United States.
1993 – Joanne L. Strollo elected OSIA's first woman national president.
1998 – President Bill Clinton becomes the first U.S. president to attend the SIF's NELA gala, and attends again in 1999 and 2000.
2002 – OSIA delegation makes first official visit of 21st century to Italy to meet with Italian government, business and culture leaders including the president of Italy, Carlo Azeglio Ciampi.
2004 – President George W. Bush and Italy's Prime Minister Silvio Berlusconi attend the 16th annual NELA gala. It was the first time a sitting U.S. president and a prime minister of Italy attended a major non-profit event in America together.
OSIA holds pilgrimage to Italy to kick off upcoming centennial year celebrations. Delegation meets with then-Pope John Paul II, President Carlo Azeglio Ciampi and other government officials and holds gala dinner in Rome.
Grand Street in New York City is renamed “Sons of Italy Way.”
2005 – OSIA celebrates its 100th anniversary. Since its founding it has established more than 2,800 lodges in 43 states and the District of Columbia.
2008 – The Sons of Italy Foundation® holds the 20th Anniversary National Education & Leadership Awards Gala in Washington, D.C., celebrating two decades of honoring Italian American achievement. 
2009 – The SIF marks its 50th Anniversary with more than $108 million given to support education, medical research, disaster relief, cultural preservation and other projects.
Vice President Joe Biden becomes the first individual not of Italian ancestry to receive the SIF's top honor, the National Education & Leadership Award.
2010 – At the 22nd Annual NELA Gala President Bill Clinton receives the Sons of Italy Lifetime Achievement Award for Public Service.
The College Board reinstates the Advanced Placement (AP) Italian Language and Culture Program, thanks to a $3 million contribution from the Sons of Italy and other organizations
2010 – The SIF presents a $10,000 scholarship to Sgt. Salvatore Giunta, the first living American serviceman to receive the Medal of Honor since Vietnam.
2012 – Then-Secretary of State Hillary Rodham Clinton and former Chairman of the Joint Chiefs of Staff General Peter Pace, USMC (Ret.), are honored by the SIF at the NELA Gala.
2012 – The SIF holds the Silver Anniversary National Education & Leadership Awards Gala in Washington, D.C., honoring Chrysler/Fiat CEO Sergio Marchionne, former Chairman of the Joint Chiefs of Staff General Colin Powell, USA (Ret.), and actor/veteran's activist Gary Sinise.

See also
 Unico National

References

External links
 www.osia.org Order Sons and Daughters of Italy in America
 www.ordersonsofitalycanada.com Order Sons of Italy of Canada
 www.lib.umn.edu/ihrca Immigration History Research Center Archives, University of Minnesota Libraries. The IHRC Archives holds the organizational records for the OSIA National Office, as well as records for many Grand Lodges and Lodges.

Italian-American organizations
Organizations established in 1905
Ethnic fraternal orders in the United States
1905 establishments in the United States
Italian language in the United States